Katherine Victoria Boyle  is a zooarchaeologist. She is a Fellow of, and Director of Studies in Archaeology & Anthropology, at Homerton College, Cambridge. She was elected as a Fellow of the Society of Antiquaries of London on 6 June 2010.

Select publications
Boyle, K. 1990. Upper Palaeolithic Faunas from South West France: A Zoogeographic Perspective.  (BAR International 557). Oxford, BAR
Boyle, K. 1998. The Middle Palaeolithic Geography of Southern France: Resources and Site Location (BAR International 723). Oxford, BAR
 
Mellars, P., K. Boyle, O. Bar-Yosef, & C. Stringer (eds) 2007. Rethinking the Human Revolution. Cambridge, McDonald Institute for Archaeological Research
Boyle, K., C. Gamble & O. Bar-Yosef (eds.) 2010. The Upper Palaeolithic Revolution in Global Perspective: Essays in Honour of Paul Mellars. Cambridge, McDonald Institute for Archaeological Research.

References

Living people
British women archaeologists
Fellows of the Society of Antiquaries of London
Fellows of Homerton College, Cambridge
Zooarchaeologists
Alumni of the University of Sheffield
Alumni of the University of Southampton
Alumni of the University of Cambridge
Year of birth missing (living people)